Mermitelocerus is a genus of plant bug belonging to the family Miridae.

Species
 Mermitelocerus schmidtii Fieber, 1836
 Mermitelocerus annulipes Reuter 1908
 Mermitelocerus viridis Yasunaga & Miyamoto 1991

References 

Miridae genera
Hemiptera of Europe
Mirini